Barú District may refer to:

 Barú District, Chiriquí, in Chiriquí, Panama
 Barú District, Pérez Zeledón, in Pérez Zeledón Canton, San José province, Costa Rica

District name disambiguation pages